Weddington is a suburban town in Union County, North Carolina, United States. A small portion of the town extends into Mecklenburg County. The population was 9,459 at the 2010 census. It is a suburb in the Charlotte metropolitan area. The current mayor of Weddington is Craig Horn.

Geography
Weddington is located at  (35.022007, -80.731808).

According to the United States Census Bureau, the town has a total area of 15.9 square miles (41.2 km), of which 15.8 square miles (40.9 km)  is land and 0.1 square mile (0.3 km)  (0.69%) is water.

Demographics

2020 census

As of the 2020 United States census, there were 13,181 people, 3,424 households, and 3,065 families residing in the town.

2010 census
At the 2010 census there were 9,459 people, 2,772 households, and 2,561 families in the town. The population density was 424.0 people per square mile (163.7/km). There were 2,919 housing units at an average density of 140.2 per square mile (54.1/km). The racial makeup of the town was 93.4% White, 2.9% African American, 4.48% Asian, 1.0% from other races, and 1.7% from two or more races. Hispanic or Latino of any race were 5.2%.

Of the 2,772 households 46.1 had children under the age of 18 living with them, 89.2% were married couples living together, 0.9% had a female householder with no husband present, and 7.6% were non-families. 5.6% of households were one person and 1.2% were one person aged 65 or older. The average household size was 3.32 and the average family size was 3.46.

The age distribution was 29.5% under the age of 18, 5.6% from 18 to 24, 18.4% from 25 to 44, 37.1% from 45 to 64, and 9.4% 65 or older. The median age was 43.3 years. For every 100 females, there were 101.1 males.

The median household income was $132,331 and the median family income  was $139,050. Males had a median income of $105,054 versus $57,368 for females. The per capita income for the town was $48,209. About 0.5% of families and 1.5% of the population were below the poverty line, including 1.9% of those under age 18 and 2.5% of those age 65 or over.

Weddington is notable for being North Carolina's third wealthiest town in terms of median household income.

References

External links
 Official website of Weddington, NC

Towns in Union County, North Carolina
Towns in Mecklenburg County, North Carolina
Towns in North Carolina